is a train station on the JR West Onoda Line in Ube, Yamaguchi Prefecture, Japan.

Station layout
The unattended station consists of one side platform serving a single track. There is a waiting room next to the platform.

History
The station opened on 16 May, 1929.

References

External links

  

Railway stations in Yamaguchi Prefecture